Maliya is a town in Morbi district of Gujarat state of India. Before the establishment of Morbi district on  15 August 2013, Maliya was a part of Rajkot district.

See also 
 Morbi district

References 

Cities and towns in Morbi district